Eupeodes pomus, the short-tailed aphideater, is a species of syrphid fly observed across North America. Hoverflies can remain nearly motionless in flight. The adults are also known as flower flies for they are commonly found on flowers from which they get both energy-giving nectar and protein-rich pollen. Larvae have been reported feeding from various aphids.

References

Diptera of North America
Syrphinae
Hoverflies of North America
Insects described in 1921